Benni is a human name and may refer to:

As a surname
 Antonio Stefano Benni (1880–1945), an Italian fascist politician
 Arthur Benni (1839–1867), a Polish-born English journalist and activist
 Ignatius Behnam II Benni (1831–1897), a Patriarch of the Syriac Catholic Church
 Stefano Benni (1947– ), an Italian writer

As a given name
 Benni Bødker  (1975 – ), a Danish writer
 Benni Efrat (1936– ), an Israeli artist
 Benni Ljungbeck  (1958– ), a Swedish wrestler
 Benni McCarthy (1977– ), a South African former footballer (given name is actually Benedict)
 Benni Miller (1984- ), American drag queen (given name is actually Bennie)
 Benni Korzen (1938– ), a Danish film producer

See also
 Trapania benni, a species of sea slug
 Beni (disambiguation)
 Bennie (surname)
 Bennis, a surname
 Benny (disambiguation)
 Benny (surname)